1st (City of London) Battalion, London Regiment (Royal Fusiliers) was an infantry battalion in the British Army.

Rifle Volunteers 1859-1908
It originated in 1859 as the 19th Middlesex Rifle Volunteer Corps, being renumbered the 10th Middlesex Rifle Volunteer Corps in 1880. On the creation of the Volunteer Force in 1881 it was made 1st Volunteer Battalion, Royal Fusiliers (City of London Regiment).

Territorial Force 1908-1945

On the creation of the Territorial Force in 1908, the unit became 1st (City of London) Battalion, London Regiment (Royal Fusiliers). In 1913 Yeomanry House, Bloomsbury was constructed forming the headquarters and drill hall for the battalion. The Battalion was mobilised here in August 1914 and was deployed on railway guarding duties before sailing for Malta and, ultimately, for the Western Front. It is mentioned on both the Royal Fusiliers War Memorial and London Troops Memorial, whilst its World War One casualties are listed by name in the roll of honour at the Royal Fusiliers Chapel in St Sepulchre-without-Newgate.

When the London Regiment disbanded in 1937, the battalion was re-attached to the Royal Fusiliers and renamed 8th (1st City of London) Battalion, The Royal Fusiliers (City of London Regiment).

Post war
The battalion remained with the Royal Fusiliers in the initial post-war period, becoming The City of London Battalion, The Royal Fusiliers (City of London Regiment) in 1961, absorbing 624th Light Anti-Aircraft Regiment Royal Artillery (Royal Fusiliers). In the army re-organisation of the late 1960s the four regular fusilier regiments of the British Army merged to form the Royal Regiment of Fusiliers. The City of London was reduced to company-strength and became C Company within the new regiment's 5th (Volunteer) Battalion. In 1988 that battalion was switched to a dual affiliation with the Royal Regiment of Fusiliers and The Queen's Regiment, meaning it was renamed 8th (Volunteer) Battalion The Queen's Fusiliers (City of London), still with a C (City of London) Company. In 1993 a new London Regiment was established. 8th Battalion, Queen's Fusiliers was split up, with A Company and one platoon of C Company merged to form the new regiment's C (City of London Fusiliers) Company, the rest of C Company forming part of the new HQ (Anzio) Company and with B Company becoming the new B (Queen's Regiment) Company. In 2006 C (City of London) Company of the London Regiment was renamed 3 (City of London Fusiliers) Company.

References

01
Royal Fusiliers
Military units and formations in London
Military units and formations established in 1908